Steven Glenn Cargile (born June 2, 1982) is a former American football safety in the National Football League for the Dallas Cowboys, Denver Broncos, Cleveland Browns and New York Giants. He played college football at Columbia University.

Early years
Cargile attended St. Peter Chanel High School, where he practiced football, basketball, track and baseball. As a senior in football, he was an All-state selection at wide receiver and All-conference at safety, while helping his team achieve a 13-1 record. He was named all-county in basketball, while helping hid team win the Division III state championship.

He attended Columbia University, where he played college football as a wide receiver in his first three years. As a sophomore, he appeared in 7 games  a backup, tallying 14 receptions for 184 yards and 3 touchdowns.

As a junior, he started 7 out of 10 games at wide receiver, making 24 receptions (fourth on the team) for 320 yards and 4 touchdowns.

As a senior, he was converted into a strong safety, registering 10 starts, 99 tackles (led the team), 3 passes defensed, 2 interceptions and one forced fumble, while receiving Second-team All-Ivy League recognition.

Professional career

Dallas Cowboys
Cargile was signed as an undrafted free agent by the Dallas Cowboys after the 2004 NFL Draft. He was waived on September 5 and signed to the practice squad. He was promoted to the active roster on December 5, but was declared inactive for the game against the New York Giants. He was released on May 3, 2005.

Tampa Bay Buccaneers (first stint)
After being out of football for a year, he was signed as a free agent by the Tampa Bay Buccaneers on January 10, 2006. He was cut on September 2.

Denver Broncos
On November 13, 2006, the Denver Broncos signed him to their practice squad. He was promoted to the active roster and played in three games, after safety Nick Ferguson was placed on the injured reserve list.

In 2007, he was tried at outside linebacker before being released on September 1 and later signed to the practice squad. On September 29, he was promoted to the active roster. He was cut on April 28, 2008, after playing mainly on special teams for the Broncos.

Cleveland Browns
On April 30, 2008, he was claimed off waivers by the Cleveland Browns. He was released on August 10.

New York Giants
On January 16, 2009, he signed with the New York Giants as a free agent. He was waived on August 1.

Tampa Bay Buccaneers (second stint)
On August 19, 2009, he was signed as a free agent by the Tampa Bay Buccaneers. He was released on September 5. He was re-signed on September 19 and cut 3 days later.

Personal life
Since 2011, he has worked as a professional scout for the New England Patriots.

References

1982 births
Living people
People from Bedford, Ohio
Players of American football from Ohio
American football cornerbacks
American football safeties
Columbia Lions football players
Dallas Cowboys players
Denver Broncos players
Tampa Bay Buccaneers players
New England Patriots scouts